WMJY (93.7 MHz, "Magic 93.7") is a commercial FM radio station, licensed to Biloxi, Mississippi and serving the Biloxi-Gulfport-Pascagoula radio market. The station is owned by iHeartMedia, Inc., and it broadcasts an adult contemporary radio format, switching to Christmas music for part of November and December.  The studios are on Debuys Road in Biloxi.

WMJY has an effective radiated power (ERP) of 100,000 watts horizontal polarization and 98,300 watts vertical.  The transmitter tower is off Mississippi Highway 37 in Vancleave.  The signal covers an area from Mobile in the east to the suburbs of New Orleans in the west.

History
Its call sign was WVMI-FM and it was owned by New South Communications, along with WVMI 570 AM (now off the air). WVMI-FM's original frequency was 106.3 MHz, powered at 3,000 watts, a fraction of its current output. It later moved to 93.7 MHz, coupled with a power increase, allowing it to be heard across numerous Gulf Coast cities. It switched its call letters to WQID. 

In the 1970s and 80s, WQID was a popular Top 40 station, with a large following among youthful listeners.  A series of ownership changes and format flips ensued and WQID found itself in a ratings slump in the early 1990s.  Starr Broadcasting bought WQID along with AM sister station WVMI in 1994 and changed FM station's format to Soft AC as WMJY, Magic 93.7. The station has been a long-time ratings leader with adults along the Gulf Coast.

Multi-Market Radio bought out Starr Broadcasting in 1994.  Multi-Market Radio was acquired by Clear Channel Communications in 2001.  In 2014, Clear Channel changed its name to iHeartMedia, the current owner.

References

External links
WMJY official website

MJY
Mainstream adult contemporary radio stations in the United States
IHeartMedia radio stations